Vaida Sipavičiūtė (born November 6, 1985) is a Lithuanian professional basketball player. She plays for Club Atletico Faenza (Italy) and Lithuania women's national basketball team. She has represented national team in EuroBasket Women 2011 competition. She has spent 4 years in Syracuse Orange team.

Clubs 
 2005–2008: Syracuse Orange (NCAA)
 2008–2009: Arras Pays d'Artois Basket Féminin (LFB)
 2009–2010: Szeviep Szeged (Hungary)
 2010–2011: Tarbes (LFB)
 2011: Club Atletico Faenza (Italy)
 2011–2012: VICI Aiste Kaunas (Lithuania)

References

External links 
 FIBA Europe profile
 Basketnews profile 
 Eurobasket profile
 Syracuse Orange profile

1985 births
Living people
Lithuanian women's basketball players
Basketball players from Kaunas
Centers (basketball)